I Hate Luv Storys is a 2010 Indian Hindi-language romantic comedy film written and directed by Punit Malhotra and produced under Karan Johar's Dharma Productions and Ronnie Screwvala's UTV Motion Pictures. It stars Imran Khan and Sonam Kapoor. Shot in Mumbai, India and Queenstown, New Zealand the film's soundtrack was composed by the musical duo Vishal–Shekhar with lyrics penned by Anvita Dutt Guptan, Kumaar and Vishal himself.

I Hate Luv Storys released on 2 July 2010 and went on to become a box office hit, grossing ₹66 crore worldwide. It received mixed-to-positive reviews from critics, with praise for its novel concept, music, cinematography, humor, costumes and the leads' performances, but criticism for its screenplay and pacing.

At the 56th Filmfare Awards, I Hate Luv Storys received 4 nominations – Best Music Director (Vishal–Shekhar), Best Lyricist (Vishal for "Bin Tere"), Best Male Playback Singer (Shafqat Amanat Ali for "Bin Tere") and Best Female Playback Singer (Shreya Ghoshal for "Bahara").

Plot 
Simran (Sonam Kapoor) loves Bollywood romances so much so that her life has begun to resemble one. With her awesome job as an art director in films and a "Mr. Perfect" fiancé, Raj (Sameer Dattani), she lives a dreamy life. But then comes Jay (Imran Khan), who brings a fresh joy into her life. Jay is an assistant to a director who is famous for his love story films, but Jay himself is repulsed to romances and is a firm disbeliever of love. He initially chides Simran for her obsession with romance, and Simran also has a bad impression of him, but soon after, the two become friends while working on Veer's next.

Simran's close bond with Jay brings problems in her love life. She feels that Raj is not right for her, and falls in love with Jay, dreaming of spending her entire life with him. She decides to confess her feelings to him, but after doing so, Jay explains that he never thought of her that way—they were only best friends. Heartbroken, Simran leaves and does not speak to Jay.

Jay finds that her absence in his life upsets him and realizes that he has fallen in love with her. He plans a romantic dinner, asking Simran to meet him. He admits that he loves her but this time, she rejects him, as she does not want to hurt Raj's feelings after giving him another chance. A heartbroken Jay tries to accept the fact that he has lost Simran to Raj. However, Jay's friends and his mother persuade him to not give up on Simran. Jay tries to make Simran jealous but soon realizes that manipulating her feelings will hurt her even more.

Meanwhile, Raj proposes to Simran, and she accepts. But Simran realizes she doesn't love Raj, and tells him so. She goes to the movie premiere, where she hopes to meet Jay. On the other hand, Jay is leaving, as he has given up all hopes of being with Simran. At the airport, he talks to his mother and she again asks him not to give up. Encouraged, Jay runs back to the premiere. He finds Simran outside the theatre and the two express their love for each other and hug, finally getting their happy ending.

Cast 
 Imran Khan as Jay 'J' Dhingra / Jayant Pandey
 Sonam Kapoor as Simran Pahuja
 Samir Soni as Veer Kapoor
 Sammir Dattani as Raj Dholakia
 Aamir Ali as Rajiv / Rahul
 Pooja Ghai Rawal as Priya / Sanjana 
 Kavin Dave as Kunal Thakur 
 Bruna Abdullah as Giselle
 Ketki Dave as Simran's mother
 Anju Mahendru as Jay's mother
 Aseem Tiwari as Nikhil Khanna
 Shireesh Sharma as Simran's Dad
 Khushboo Shroff as Nidhi Dev
 Avantika Malik Khan in a special appearance
 Himarsha Venkatsamy in a special appearance

Production 
The title I Hate Luv Storys is an intentional misspelling of the sentence "I Hate Love Stories", and was chosen for numerological reasons.

Reception

Critical response 
Among Indian critics, Sukanya Verma of Rediff praised the lead performances and rated the movie 3.5/5 saying, "It's Sonam and Imran's collective persona and their free-flowing chemistry that makes all the difference. Although the pair deserve better than an amateurishly written romance to scoop out their terrific potential as a combination". Gaurav Malani of IndiaTimes rated the movie 3/5 and said, "If you hate love stories this one's certainly not for you. Which means this ends up being another love story and that too a dull one!" Nikhat Kazmi of Times of India also praised the lead performances, but found the plot predictable and rated the movie 3/5 saying, "Thematically, I Hate Luv Storys is extremely simplistic, uni-layered and terribly predictable."

Rahul Nanda of Filmfare rated it 3/5 and said, "The film never equals the sum of all its part, but it's impossible to deny the energy with which it keeps the plot ticking on." Taran Adarsh of Bollywood Hungama gave it 3.5/5 saying, "On the whole, I Hate Luv Storys is a young and vibrant love story with tremendous appeal for the yuppies. The fresh pairing and the on-screen electrifying chemistry, the lilting musical score and the magical moments in the film should attract its target audience." Parimal M. Rohit of Buzzine Bollywood added, "I Hate Luv Storys features no shortage of cheesy dialogue, simplistically thematic humor, and unrealistic depictions of lifestyles" but still has "some redeeming values (such as) the chemistry between Sonam Kapoor and Imran Khan ... strong individual performances, genuine corniness, and memorable avatars...." Subhash K. Jha was not impressed, calling it "a disappointment." The Hindu in its review said " After trying to be versatile, Imran has returned to familiar romantic terrain. His Jay is only a couple of streets away from the Jai he played in Jaane Tu… Ya Jaane Naa (2008). He has mastered four-five expressions which establish his uber-cool credentials quite well...Sonam's face lights up the proceedings every time the mind says, “Enough!” If there is something called intelligent innocence, she has it, but it is waiting to be explored."

Box office 
I Hate Luv Storys had a strong opening in multiplexes and a good opening in single screens. It collected Rs. 66.0 crore and was declared a hit at the box office.

Awards and nominations 
2011 Star Screen Awards:
 Won – Best Female Playback Singer – Shreya Ghoshal for "Bahara"
 Nominated – Best Actor (Popular Choice) – Imran Khan
56th Filmfare Awards:
 Nominated – Best Music Director – Vishal–Shekhar
 Nominated – Best Lyricist – Vishal Dadlani for "Bin Tere"
 Nominated – Best Male Playback Singer – Shafqat Amanat Ali for "Bin Tere"
 Nominated – Best Female Playback Singer – Shreya Ghoshal for "Bahara"

6th Apsara Film & Television Producers Guild Awards:
 Nominated – Best Music Director – Vishal–Shekhar

2011 Zee Cine Awards:
 Nominated – Most Promising Director – Punit Malhotra
 Nominated – Best Track of the Year – "Bin Tere"
 Nominated – Best Male Playback Singer – Shafqat Amanat Ali for "Bin Tere"

Soundtrack 

The soundtrack of I Hate Luv Storys is composed by Vishal–Shekhar. The film has 5 original songs followed by 3 remixes. The soundtrack was released on 25 May 2010. It received a favorable review from Parimal M. Rohit of Buzzine Bollywood, with the author saying, "the soundtrack is phenomenally and breathtakingly romantic. The smooth beats and hypnotic vocals are second to none, and very few soundtracks are as complete as this one." Ehsaan Noorani of Shankar–Ehsaan–Loy trio has provided one of the best guitar arrangements for the soundtrack. A part of the song "Bahara" was used in Bulgarian pop-folk singer Tedi Aleksandrova's song "Dai Mi Svoboda".

Track list

References

External links 
 
 
 
 
 
 

2010s Hindi-language films
2010 films
2010 romantic comedy films
Films set in India
Films scored by Vishal–Shekhar
UTV Motion Pictures films
2010 directorial debut films
Indian romantic comedy films